Muli (also Romanized as Mūlī; also known as Mūlū) is a village in Osmanvand Rural District, Firuzabad District, Kermanshah County, Kermanshah Province, Iran. At the 2006 census, its population was 26, in 6 families.

References 

Populated places in Kermanshah County